An atgeir, sometimes called a "mail-piercer" or "hewing-spear", was a type of polearm in use in Viking Age Scandinavia and Norse colonies in the British Isles and Iceland. The word is related to the Old Norse geirr, meaning spear. It is usually translated in English as "halberd", but most likely closer resembled a bill or glaive during the Viking age. Another view is that the term had no association with a specific weapon until it is used as an anachronism in saga literature to lend weight to accounts of special weapons. Later the word was used for typical European halberds, and even later multipurpose staves with spearheads were called atgeirsstafir.

The term is first used as a term in Old Norse sources after the Viking Age. It is not used in any Viking Age source and there are no remains from archaeology which can be identified with the term. The references from saga literature are not relevant to the Viking Age but come from Iceland of the thirteenth century and later. Originally it meant 'most spear-like spear' i.e. best spear, and can refer to a light or a heavy weapon.

Arguably the most famous atgeir was Gunnar Hámundarson's, as described in Njal's Saga. According to the saga, this weapon would make a ringing sound (or "sing") when it was taken down in anticipation of bloodshed. However, Njal's saga is one of the latest and most obviously authored sagas, and details of clothing or weaponry are almost without doubt based on medieval models, not Viking ones.

See also
 Viking Age arms and armour

Notes

References
 Cook, Robert (transl.) Njal's Saga. Penguin Classics, 2001.
 Oakeshott, R. Ewart. The Archaeology of Weapons: Arms and Armour from Prehistory to the Age of Chivalry. London: Lutterworth Press, 1960. pp. 119–120.
 Keller,M.C., The Anglo-Saxon Weapon Names Treated Etymologically and Archæologically, Heidelberg 1906.
 Sigurdsson,G., The Medieval Icelandic Saga and Oral Tradition, Harvard University 2004.

Viking warfare
Spears
Medieval polearms
Germanic weapons